The Direction Générale de la Gendarmerie nationale (DGGN) is the department of Interior Ministry (France) with responsibility for operational management of the National Gendarmerie  in coordination with the Chef d'État-Major des Armées (CEMA).

Mission and responsibilities
The DGGN administrative responsibilities cover:
 Operations
 Personnel
 Logistics
 Finance

Organisation 
The DGGN is headed by the Director General of the National Gendarmerie, who is nominated by the Interior minister and can be:
 General in the National Gendarmerie
 A Magistrate
 Civil Servant (Grade A3 and above)

The DGGN shares responsibilities with the DGPN (Directorate-General of the National Police) in the following areas:
 Directorate General of International Cooperation
 The domestic security Technology and Information systems service

In addition since 2014  a further department is under the joint control of the DGGN, DGPN and the DGSCGC (Directorate-General for Civil Protection and Crises);
 The domestic security Purchasing and logistics service.

See also 

 French National Police
 Direction Régionale de Police Judiciaire de Paris

References

French Gendarmerie
National law enforcement agencies of France
Military of France